Lee Hong-chi (born 10 May 1990) is a Taiwanese actor. He is best known for starring in the 2015 film Thanatos, Drunk, for which he was named Best New Performer at the 52nd Golden Horse Awards.

Early life
Lee was born in Jinshan District, New Taipei. He was educated at the Taipei Hwa Kang Arts School and at the Chinese Culture University.

Filmography

Film

Television series

Music video

Awards and nominations

References

External links
 
 

1990 births
Living people
Taiwanese male film actors
21st-century Taiwanese male actors
Chinese Culture University alumni
Male actors from New Taipei
Male actors from Taipei
Taiwanese male television actors